Shibei District is an urban district of Qingdao, Shandong Province, People's Republic of China. In December 2012, the neighbouring Sifang District was merged into Shibei.

Administrative divisions 
Shibei District is divided into 23 subdistricts, the latter seven of which were ceded from Sifang District:

Economy

Port 
Shibei is home to part of the Qingdao Port, one of China's major trade ports and the seventh busiest in the world, with wharves for ore, crude oil, and coal. It operates more than 125 international sea routes to more than 450 ports in more than 130 countries and regions around the world. In 2009, the port handled 317 million tons of cargo, with 222 million tons from foreign trade and 10.28 million standard containers, making it the world's seventh largest port (ninth in foreign cargo).

References

External links 
 Information page

Geography of Qingdao
County-level divisions of Shandong
Districts of China